Oberto or Otbert may refer to:
 Oberto (opera), an opera by Giuseppe Verdi
 Oberto Sausage Company, a manufacturer of sausage products based in Kent, Washington, USA
 Oberto I (died 975), Count palatine of Italy and founder of the Obertenghi dynasty
 Oberto II (died after 1014), Margrave of Milan, son of Oberto I
 Oberto II of Biandrate, Count of Biandrate and a participant in the Fourth Crusade
 Oberto, a character in Alcina by Georg Friedrich Händel

People with the surname
 Fabricio Oberto (born 1975), Argentine basketball player
 Francesco di Oberto, 14th-century early Renaissance painter
 Luis Enrique Oberto (1928–2022), Venezuelan politician
 Orlando Oberto (born 1980), Italian baseball player

People with the given name
 Oberto Airaudi (born 1950), founder of the spiritual community of Damanhur near Turin, Italy
 Oberto Doria (died 1295), politician and admiral of the Republic of Genoa
 Oberto Pelavicino, or Pallavicino (1197-1269), Italian field captain under Holy Roman Emperor Frederick II
 Oberto Spinola, a leader of the Republic of Genoa in the 13th century

See also
 Otbert of Liège (died 1119), bishop of Liège and major figure in the financing of the First Crusade